Chromosome 12 is one of the 23 pairs of chromosomes in humans. People normally have two copies of this chromosome. Chromosome 12 spans about 133 million base pairs (the building material of DNA) and represents between 4 and 4.5 percent of the total DNA in cells.

Chromosome 12 contains the Homeobox C gene cluster.

Genes

Number of genes 
The following are some of the gene count estimates of human chromosome 12. Because researchers use different approaches to genome annotation their predictions of the number of genes on each chromosome varies (for technical details, see gene prediction). Among various projects, the collaborative consensus coding sequence project (CCDS) takes an extremely conservative strategy. So CCDS's gene number prediction represents a lower bound on the total number of human protein-coding genes.

Gene list 

The following is a partial list of genes on human chromosome 12. For complete list, see the link in the infobox on the right.

Diseases and disorders 
The following diseases are some of those related to genes on chromosome 12:

 achondrogenesis type 2
 collagenopathy, types II and XI
 cornea plana 2
 episodic ataxia
 hereditary hemorrhagic telangiectasia
 hypochondrogenesis
 ichthyosis bullosa of Siemens
 Kniest dysplasia
 Kabuki syndrome
 maturity onset diabetes of the young type 3
 methylmalonic acidemia
 narcolepsy
 nonsyndromic deafness
 Noonan syndrome
 Parkinson disease
 Pallister-Killian syndrome (tetrasomy 12p)
 phenylketonuria
 spondyloepimetaphyseal dysplasia, Strudwick type
 spondyloepiphyseal dysplasia congenita
 spondyloperipheral dysplasia
 Stickler syndrome, (COL2A1-related)
 Stuttering
 Triose Phosphate Isomerase deficiency
 tyrosinemia
 Von Willebrand Disease

Cytogenetic band

References

External links

 
 

Chromosomes (human)